Dongguan Subdistrict is a subdistrict of Beishi District, in the heart of Baoding, Hebei, People's Republic of China. , it has 10 residential communities and 3 villages under its administration.

See also
List of township-level divisions of Hebei

References

Township-level divisions of Hebei
Lianchi District